Sea surface temperature (SST), or ocean surface temperature, is the ocean temperature close to the surface. Air masses in the Earth's atmosphere are highly modified by sea surface temperatures within a short distance of the shore. Localized areas of heavy snow can form in bands downwind of warm water bodies within an otherwise cold air mass. Warm sea surface temperatures are known to be a cause of tropical cyclogenesis over the Earth's oceans. Tropical cyclones can also cause a cool wake, due to turbulent mixing of the upper  of the ocean. SST changes diurnally, like the air above it, but to a lesser degree. There is less SST variation on breezy days than on calm days. In addition, ocean currents such as the Atlantic Multidecadal Oscillation (AMO), can affect SST's on multi-decadal time scales, a major impact results from the global thermohaline circulation, which affects average SST significantly throughout most of the world's oceans.

Coastal SSTs can cause offshore winds to generate upwelling, which can significantly cool or warm nearby landmasses, but shallower waters over a continental shelf are often warmer.  Onshore winds can cause a considerable warm-up even in areas where upwelling is fairly constant, such as the northwest coast of South America.  Its values are important within numerical weather prediction as the SST influences the atmosphere above, such as in the formation of sea breezes and sea fog.  It is also used to calibrate measurements from weather satellites.

It is very likely that global mean sea surface temperature increased by 0.88°C between 1850-1900 and 2011-2020 due to global warming, with most of that warming (0.60°C) occurring between 1980 and 2020. Land surface temperatures have increased faster than ocean temperatures as the ocean absorbs about 92% of excess heat generated by climate change.

Definitions 
Sea surface temperature (SST), or ocean surface temperature, is the water temperature close to the ocean's surface.

The temperature further below that is called ocean temperature or deeper ocean temperature. Ocean temperatures (more than 20 metres below the surface) also vary by region and time, and they contribute to variations in ocean heat content and ocean stratification. The increase of both ocean surface temperature and deeper ocean temperature is an important effect of climate change on oceans.

Variations and changes

Local variations 

The SST has a diurnal range, just like the Earth's atmosphere above, though to a lesser degree due to its greater specific heat. The temperature of the ocean at depth lags the Earth's atmosphere temperature by 15 days per , which means for locations like the Aral Sea, temperatures near its bottom reach a maximum in December and a minimum in May and June. Near the coastline, some offshore and longshore winds move the warm waters near the surface offshore, and replace them with cooler water from below in the process known as Ekman transport. This pattern generally increases nutrients for marine life in the region, and can have a profound effect in some regions where the bottom waters are particularly nutrient-rich. Offshore of river deltas, freshwater flows over the top of the denser seawater, which allows it to heat faster due to limited vertical mixing. Remotely sensed SST can be used to detect the surface temperature signature due to tropical cyclones. In general, an SST cooling is observed after the passing of a hurricane, primarily as the result of mixed layer deepening and surface heat losses. In the wake of several day long Saharan dust outbreaks across the adjacent northern Atlantic Ocean, sea surface temperatures are reduced 0.2 C to 0.4 C (0.3 to 0.7 F). Other sources of short-term SST fluctuation include extratropical cyclones, rapid influxes of glacial fresh water and concentrated phytoplankton blooms due to seasonal cycles or agricultural run-off.

The tropical ocean has been warming faster than other regions since 1950, with the greatest rates of warming in the tropical Indian Ocean, western Pacific Ocean, and western boundary currents of the subtropical gyres. However, the eastern Pacific Ocean, subtropical North Atlantic Ocean, and Southern Ocean have warmed more slowly than the global average or have experienced cooling since the 1950s.

Atlantic Multidecadal Oscillation 
The Atlantic Multidecadal Oscillation (AMO) is an important driver of North Atlantic SST and Northern Hemisphere climate, but the mechanisms controlling AMO variability remain poorly understood. Atmospheric internal variability, changes in ocean circulation, or anthropogenic drivers may control the multidecadal temperature variability associated with AMO. These changes in North Atlantic SST may influence winds in the subtropical North Pacific and produce warmer SSTs in the western Pacific Ocean.

Regional variations 

El Niño is defined by prolonged differences in Pacific Ocean surface temperatures when compared with the average value. The accepted definition is a warming or cooling of at least 0.5 °C (0.9 °F) averaged over the east-central tropical Pacific Ocean.  Typically, this anomaly happens at irregular intervals of 2–7 years and lasts nine months to two years. The average period length is 5 years. When this warming or cooling occurs for only seven to nine months, it is classified as El Niño/La Niña "conditions"; when it occurs for more than that period, it is classified as El Niño/La Niña "episodes".

The sign of an El Niño in the sea surface temperature pattern is when warm water spreads from the west Pacific and the Indian Ocean to the east Pacific. It takes the rain with it, causing extensive drought in the western Pacific and rainfall in the normally dry eastern Pacific.  El Niño's warm rush of nutrient-poor tropical water, heated by its eastward passage in the Equatorial Current, replaces the cold, nutrient-rich surface water of the Humboldt Current. When El Niño conditions last for many months, extensive ocean warming and the reduction in Easterly Trade winds limits upwelling of cold nutrient-rich deep water and its economic impact to local fishing for an international market can be serious.

Among scientists, there is medium confidence that the tropical Pacific will transition to a mean pattern resembling that of El Niño on centennial time scale, but there is still high uncertainty in tropical Pacific SST projections because it is difficult to capture El Niño variability in climate models.

Recent increase due to climate change 

Overall, scientists project that all regions of the oceans will warm by 2050, but models disagree for SST changes expected in the subpolar North Atlantic, the equatorial Pacific, and the Southern Ocean. The future global mean SST increase for the period 1995-2014 to 2081-2100 is 0.86°C under the most modest greenhouse gas emissions scenarios, and up to 2.89°C under the most severe emissions scenarios.

Measurement

There are a variety of techniques for measuring this parameter that can potentially yield different results because different things are actually being measured.  Away from the immediate sea surface, general temperature measurements are accompanied by a reference to the specific depth of measurement.  This is because of significant differences encountered between measurements made at different depths, especially during the daytime when low wind speed and high sunshine conditions may lead to the formation of a warm layer at the ocean's surface and strong vertical temperature gradients (a diurnal thermocline).   Sea surface temperature measurements are confined to the top portion of the ocean, known as the near-surface layer.

Thermometers
SST was one of the first oceanographic variables to be measured.  Benjamin Franklin suspended a mercury thermometer from a ship while travelling between the United States and Europe in his survey of the Gulf Stream in the late eighteenth century.  SST was later measured by dipping a thermometer into a bucket of water that was manually drawn from the sea surface.  The first automated technique for determining SST was accomplished by measuring the temperature of water in the intake port of large ships, which was underway by 1963.  These observations have a warm bias of around  due to the heat of the engine room.  

Measurements of SST have had inconsistencies over the last 130 years due to the way they were taken. In the nineteenth century, measurements were taken in a bucket off a ship. However, there was a slight variation in temperature because of the differences in buckets. Samples were collected in either a wood or an uninsulated canvas bucket, but the canvas bucket cooled quicker than the wood bucket. The sudden change in temperature between 1940 and 1941 was the result of an undocumented change in procedure. The samples were taken near the engine intake because it was too dangerous to use lights to take measurements over the side of the ship at night. 

Many different drifting buoys exist around the world that vary in design, and the location of reliable temperature sensors varies. These measurements are beamed to satellites for automated and immediate data distribution.  A large network of coastal buoys in U.S. waters is maintained by the National Data Buoy Center (NDBC). Between 1985 and 1994, an extensive array of moored and drifting buoys was deployed across the equatorial Pacific Ocean designed to help monitor and predict the El Niño phenomenon.

Weather satellites

Weather satellites have been available to determine sea surface temperature information since 1967, with the first global composites created during 1970.  Since 1982, satellites have been increasingly utilized to measure SST and have allowed its spatial and temporal variation to be viewed more fully.  Satellite measurements of SST are in reasonable agreement with in situ temperature measurements.  The satellite measurement is made by sensing the ocean radiation in two or more wavelengths within the infrared part of the electromagnetic spectrum or other parts of the spectrum which can then be empirically related to SST. These wavelengths are chosen because they are:

 within the peak of the blackbody radiation expected from the Earth, and
 able to transmit adequately well through the atmosphere

The satellite-measured SST provides both a synoptic view of the ocean and a high frequency of repeat views, allowing the examination of basin-wide upper ocean dynamics not possible with ships or buoys.  NASA's  (National Aeronautic and Space Administration) Moderate Resolution Imaging Spectroradiometer (MODIS) SST satellites have been providing global SST data since 2000, available with a one-day lag.  NOAA's GOES (Geostationary Orbiting Earth Satellites) satellites are geo-stationary above the Western Hemisphere which enables to them to deliver SST data on an hourly basis with only a few hours of lag time.

There are several difficulties with satellite-based absolute SST measurements. First, in infrared remote sensing methodology the radiation emanates from the top "skin" of the ocean, approximately the top 0.01 mm or less, which may not represent the bulk temperature of the upper meter of ocean due primarily to effects of solar surface heating during the daytime, reflected radiation, as well as sensible heat loss and surface evaporation. All these factors make it somewhat difficult to compare satellite data to measurements from buoys or shipboard methods, complicating ground truth efforts.  Secondly, the satellite cannot look through clouds, creating a cool bias in satellite-derived SSTs within cloudy areas.  However, passive microwave techniques can accurately measure SST and penetrate cloud cover.  Within atmospheric sounder channels on weather satellites, which peak just above the ocean's surface, knowledge of the sea surface temperature is important to their calibration.

Importance to the Earth's atmosphere

Sea surface temperature affects the behavior of the Earth's atmosphere above, so their initialization into atmospheric models is important. While sea surface temperature is important for tropical cyclogenesis, it is also important in determining the formation of sea fog and sea breezes. For example, southwest of Northern Hemisphere extratropical cyclones, curved cyclonic flow bringing cold air across relatively warm water bodies can lead to narrow lake-effect snow (or sea effect) bands. Those bands bring strong localized precipitation, often in the form of snow, since large water bodies such as lakes efficiently store heat that results in significant temperature differences—larger than —between the water surface and the air above. Because of this temperature difference, warmth and moisture are transported upward, condensing into vertically oriented clouds which produce snow showers. The temperature decrease with height and cloud depth are directly affected by both the water temperature and the large-scale environment. The stronger the temperature decrease with height, the taller the clouds get, and the greater the precipitation rate becomes.

Tropical cyclones

Ocean temperature of at least 26.5°C (79.7°F) spanning through at minimum a 50-metre depth is one of the precursors needed to maintain a tropical cyclone (a type of mesocyclone).  These warm waters are needed to maintain the warm core that fuels tropical systems.  This value is well above 16.1 °C (60.9 °F), the long term global average surface temperature of the oceans. However, this requirement can be considered only a general baseline because it assumes that the ambient atmospheric environment surrounding an area of disturbed weather presents average conditions. Tropical cyclones have intensified when SSTs were slightly below this standard temperature.

Tropical cyclones are known to form even when normal conditions are not met. For example, cooler air temperatures at a higher altitude (e.g., at the 500 hPa level, or 5.9 km) can lead to tropical cyclogenesis at lower water temperatures, as a certain lapse rate is required to force the atmosphere to be unstable enough for convection. In a moist atmosphere, this lapse rate is 6.5 °C/km, while in an atmosphere with less than 100% relative humidity, the required lapse rate is 9.8 °C/km.

At the 500 hPa level, the air temperature averages −7 °C (18 °F) within the tropics, but air in the tropics is normally dry at this height, giving the air room to wet-bulb, or cool as it moistens, to a more favorable temperature that can then support convection.
This also explains why moisture in the mid-levels of the troposphere, roughly at the 500 hPa level, is normally a requirement for development. However, when dry air is found at the same height, temperatures at 500 hPa need to be even colder as dry atmospheres require a greater lapse rate for instability than moist atmospheres. At heights near the tropopause, the 30-year average temperature (as measured in the period encompassing 1961 through 1990) was −77 °C (−132 °F). A recent example of a tropical cyclone that maintained itself over cooler waters was Epsilon of the 2005 Atlantic hurricane season.

See also

 Global surface temperature
 The Blob (Pacific Ocean)
 Sea level rise 
 Halocline refers to a salinity difference often altered by temperature-dependent factors
 Loop Current, with plots of sea temperature in the Gulf of Mexico
 Pacific decadal oscillation (PDO)
 Salinity
 Ghrsst-pp the Group for High Resolution SST
 Satellite temperature measurements
 Instrumental temperature record

References

External links
 Global map of current sea surface temperatures
Global map of current sea surface temperature anomalies
 SQUAM, SST Quality Monitor (A near real-time Global QC Tool for monitoring time-series stability & cross-platform consistency of satellite SST)
 iQuam, in situ SST Quality Monitor (A near real-time quality control & monitoring system for in situ SST measured by ships and buoys)
 MICROS, Monitoring of IR Clear-sky Radiances over Oceans for SST

Aquatic ecology
Meteorological phenomena
Marine meteorology
Oceanography
Thermodynamic cycles
Articles containing video clips